Frontul Plugarilor ('Ploughmens' Front') was a weekly newspaper published from Bucharest, Romania 1945–1953. It was the organ of the organization with the same name. Frontul Plugarilor was one of several pro-communist publications that began appearing in Romania after the end of the Second World War. Gheorghe Micle and Octav Livezeanu served as the directors of the newspaper. In 1953 the newspaper was superseded by Albina.

References

External links

1945 establishments in Romania
1953 disestablishments in Romania
Defunct newspapers published in Romania
Defunct weekly newspapers
Weekly newspapers published in Romania
Newspapers published in Bucharest
Newspapers established in 1945
Publications disestablished in 1953
Socialist newspapers published in Romania
Romanian-language newspapers